The Offences at Sea Act 1536 (28 Hen 8 c 15) was an Act of the Parliament of England.

The whole Act was repealed by section 10(2) of, and Part I of Schedule 3 to, the Criminal Law Act 1967.

See also
Offences at Sea Act

References
Halsbury's Statutes,

Acts of the Parliament of England (1485–1603)
1536 in law
1536 in England
Piracy law